St. Martin and St. Nicholas Cathedral, or simply known as Bydgoszcz Cathedral, is a Catholic church built in the 15th century. It has a Gothic style, serves as a parish church and cathedral of the Diocese of Bydgoszcz. It also houses a shrine dedicated to the Virgin Mary. Its address is 10 Farna Street.

It is the most valuable architectural monument of the Old Town, standing on the Brda riverside. It has been elevated as a cathedral on March 25, 2004, by decision of then Pope John Paul II. Since November 3, 1960, the cathedral has been registered on the Kuyavian-Pomeranian heritage list.

History

Construction of the first temple 
The Bydgoszcz parish church was founded by first mayors of the city, Jan Kiesselhuth and Konrad, at the same time the parish itself was created, after Bydgoszcz establishment in 1346. The church building and its adjoining cemetery (active until 1809) were located in the north-western corner of city market place (today's Old Market Place – ), reaching the banks of Brda river and its leat branches feeding water mills (today's Mill Island).

17th-century chronicle of Bydgoszcz by Wojciech Łochowski as well as historical researches suggest that prior the construction of the parish church, an older temple dedicated to Saint Giles had been already standing in the suburbs of the old city Kujawski. From the 13th century, it served as a chapel of ease for local officials and knights of Bydgoszcz castle. After the construction of the castle in Bydgoszcz in the middle of the 14th century, Saint Giles church replaced the castle chapel. Until building completion of the parish church, it parson resided at the chapel of ease. This episode established a later but distorted tradition, making Saint Giles church the oldest parish church in Bydgoszcz; the chapel was erased in 1879 when constructing Bernardyńska Street in Bydgoszcz.

It is believed that Bydgoszcz parish church was partly made of wood church, and completed around 1364, before the erection of the first Carmelites monastery in Bydgoszcz (1398). The first mention of church priest was made on 22 July 1402, reference to the church dates back to 1408 and the title of the parish church was quoted in a 1417 document. Together with the church a parish school was established.

Part of the church were made of brick, allowing the synod of the diocese of Włocławek to take place here in January 1425. In addition, the northern wall of the present church still bears brick traces of windows and portal. In 1425, a fire destroyed some elements of the building, probably the wooden roof, while city archived documents were also lost during this disaster, according to Wojciech Łochowski's chronicles.

Construction of the Gothic Temple (1425-1466) 
The reconstruction of the temple the same year (1425) comprised the enlargement of the main building and the construction of two aisles. Since builders integrated in the new building the northern brick wall from the previous temple, the church displays a chancel wider than the nave by almost 2 meters.

Like other medieval religious structures, the construction did not interrupt the liturgical service, as mentioned in 1449 in a document related to the erection of the Holy trinity church in the northern suburb of the city (at the location of today Poor Clares' Church.

Fundings for the project, albeit fluctuating, has been mainly provided during the Thirteen Years' War (1454–66) against the Teutonic Order, when Bydgoszcz was frequently visited by Casimir IV Jagiellon, his retinue, high ranking clergy, crowds of dignitaries, knights, and by the Margrave of Brandenburg Frederick II or Eric II, Duke of Pomerania. Jan Kościelecki, local power broker and one of the major financial tycoons in Poland at the time (1457–1475), contributed also in a significant way.

The church exterior was completed in 1466: the same year, interiors decoration began by the set up of the altars: 
 Virgin birth of Jesus altar in the northern aisle in 1466;
 Stanislaus of Szczepanów altar (1488);
 main altar realised by Poznan painter Wawrzyniec Stuler, ordered by Bydgoszcz parson Mikołaj in 1460.

In 1497, Krzesław Kurozwęcki, bishop of Włocławek, organised there a synod for clergy of Kujawy. For this occasion, the church received additional dedications, complementing the one from the 14th century to Saint Nicholas: it received as patron saints Martin of Tours, Adalbert of Prague and Stanislaus of Szczepanów. The celebration of these dedications was celebrated each year, on the first Sunday after St Bartholomew the Apostle day (i.e. August 24).

 Gdańsk's St. Catherine's Church, St. Mary's Church, St. Jean's church, St. Pierre-St. Paul's church and St. Barbara's church; 
 Puck parish church;
 Church of the Holy Cross in Tczew. 
Within Kujawy, only the St. Nicholas parish church in Inowroclaw was larger.

Expansion of the 16th-18th century 

At the end of the 15th century, roofs were elevated, using pine wood, brought via the Brda river and chopped on the spot, the gable and the presbytery roofs were star-shaped vaulted. At the same time, the church's southern steeple was attached to the main corps.

From 1466 to 1617, three quadrangular chapels were erected and attached to the main body, while a fourth chapel was built at the location of the former presbytery entrance. In 1559, a turret carrying a light bell cast by master Andrzej was set up at the edge of the nave roof; another bell was suspended there in 1668. In 1702, it was replaced by a baroque turret, covered with bronze. It still stands today: it is octagonal and has a roof lantern. A new bell was ordered for this realization to bell-founder Absalom Wittwerck from Gdańsk.

In 1585, a Gothic rectangular sacristy was erected, abutting the northern chancel wall: an inscription from 1585 was discovered after the Second World War beneath the plaster of the window sill. Between 1712 and 1745, part of the wooden barrel vault ceiling between the two storeys was replaced by a lunette. In the 1650s, major construction and renovation works started:
 the tower received a third storey, as one can see today;
 a mannerist style porch was built adjacent to the west façade, with an open vestibule in the basement;
 the western part of the timber roof truss over the nave body was replaced after 1651, according to dendrochronology research, including the repair of the tower stairs.

Under the chancel floor were six vaulted burial crypts:
 Two were realised in the eastern part of the north aisle, under the altars of the Virgin Mary and St. Lawrence of Rome;
 The other four were matched with the foundations of the four chapels.

Between 1712 and 1745, the whitewashed walls of the sacristy, the chancel, the nave and the pillars between the naves were covered in some places with figural polychromes. Other decorative element of the walls were tombstone epitaphs. Most of altars and religious furniture from before the Polish partition were destroyed during the Napoleonic Wars.

Larger roof repairs occurred also at the end of the 17th century, after the destruction by the fire in 1684 of the abutting watermill: during the fire, the wind directed the flames to the northern façade of the church. It took 15 years to clean and repair these heavy damages. The catastrophe brought other diocesan parish priests, from 1712 to 1763, to write about the state of quasi-ruin of the temple and its associated buildings, which contrasted with the good condition of other city monasteries and conventual churches: the Carmelites, the Bernardines, the Jesuits. The church, however, survived in this poor position until the start of the partitions of Poland, although no major emergency investment was made.

18th-century buildings 

By the 18th century many buildings were erected in the vicinity of the church. On the church cemetery premises stood:
 a chapel house;
 a stone statue of John Nepomucene realised in 1745; 
 a vaulted crypt located near the church's northern aisle;
 a monolithic chapel and a brick mound in the shape of a crypt.

On the western side of the cemetery, on the area between today's tenement house at Przyrzecze street 2, and the memorial to the Virgin Mary Immaculate Conception of Lourdes, stood a series of buildings comprising the Building of parish school in Bydgoszcz and three houses inhabited by the vicar, his helpers and secular representatives of the church staff. The rectory was located on the eastern edge of the municipal necropolis, on today's Ks. Tadeusza Skarbka-Malczewskiego street.

Partition period (1772-1920) 
At the time of the incorporation of Bydgoszcz/Bromberg into the Kingdom of Prussia as a result of Poland partitions, the parish church was indeed in a poor technical condition. In 1794, for the needs of the Kościuszko Uprising, the silver decoration was depleted, as well as numerous valuables, for a total of 256 grzywna. Other city monasteries also donated to support the revolt, like Jesuit's and Bernardine's.

At the beginning of the 19th century, the church was nearly a ruin. During the period of the Duchy of Warsaw (1807–1815), Russian armed forces used it for military purposes: most of the side altars and removable elements were destroyed at that time.

Between 1819 and 1829, the Kingdom of Prussia funded a refurbishment of the building. During the works, part of the religious equipment was stolen and three side chapels were demolished; the chapel on the northern wall (St. Fabian & Saint Sebastian) survived. Only three old altars were preserved (Blessed Virgin Mary, Saint Barbara, St. Fabian & St. Sebastian), some altars were taken from the other monasteries of the city, liquidated by Prussian authorities: 
 two side altars -Saint Roch and Saint Anthony of Padua- from the Bernardine Church (17th to 18th century); 
 two side altars – our Lady of the Scapular and Saint Joseph- from the Carmelite church (17th to 18th century);
 a rococo picture of Carmelite brother Stanisław and four stalls with 18 seats were also taken over from the Carmelites church in Bydgoszcz.
The renovated temple was eventually re-opened in 1831 and re-consecrated. In addition, before 1875, a neo-gothic annex was erected on the spot of the former chapel of Saint Stephen.

During the Partition period, the temple was the only parish church in the city where the religious and national feeling was still alive among the Poles, especially during the Kulturkampf period.

Interwar period 

After the incorporation of Bydgoszcz into the Second Polish Republic territory in 1920, the parish was divided into five smaller ones, relieving the church of the too many number of faithfuls: in 1924 the parish covered 100 thousand people. From 1922 to 1926, church interiors were completely restored, on the initiative of the then parish priest, Father Tadeusz Skarbek-Malczewski: 
 walls and vaults were covered with polychrome motifs executed by Henryk Jackowski-Nostitz, on a design by Stefan Cybichowski (1923–1924);
 stained glass were installed;
 on the main altar, a meticulous restoration of the Virgin Mary with the Rose was carried out.

Second World War 
On January 9, 1940, the parish church was handed over by German occupying forces, formally forbidding any Poles to enter. Its new pastor was Father Alojzy Kaluschke, then prebendary of the Jesuits church on the main Old Square. Most valuable items were pillaged and sent away into Germany; to avoid such a pillage, church staff moved part of the religious equipment to country manor houses around Bydgoszcz. For instance, the image of the Virgin Mary with the Rose, identified as a masterpiece, could have been spirited off on July 23, 1943, during the night, to the church of Mąkowarsko, 35 km north of Bydgoszcz. It was brought back onto the altar of the side chapel, on September 26, 1945.

Fightings for the liberation of Bydgoszcz (January 1945) caused serious damages to the church: artillery shells burned the roof and destroyed stained glass windows. Shortly after the war, the leaking roof regularly let rain drip into the nave.

Postwar period 

After the end of World War II, the new parish priest, Father Franciszek Hanelt proceeded to heal war damage and renovate the temple. In 1950, the Madonna and the Rose was moved for conservation to Nicolaus Copernicus University in Toruń. The renovation of the stained glasses was realized by Edward Kwiatkowski, lecturer at the Faculty of History and Art of Toruń and a student of Henryk Jackowski-Nostitz, who directed the polychromy of the church before the war, via his stained glass studio "Polichromia" in Poznań: the technique followed was the one used in the 13th century on Gothic stained glass windows of the Sainte-Chapelle in Paris.
Works at the church lasted from 1952 to 1954.

In 1966, Primate of Poland Stefan Wyszyński crowned the image of Madonna with the Rose, titling it Our Lady of Beautiful Love. From 1982 to 1996, Jan Nowak, the Vicar for the city, took residence in the church, before moving to the Diocese of Siedlce as ordinary. On September 5, 1993, the Archbishop of Gniezno, Henryk Muszyński, raised the parish church to the dignity of Collegiate church, establishing a bishopric chapter dedicated to Our Lady of Beautiful Love.

On June 7, 1999, during a mass celebrated in Bydgoszcz in front of 600 000 people Pope John Paul II granted the parish the title of co-cathedral of the Archdiocese of Gniezno. In 2001, archbishop Henryk Muszyński celebrated the 750th anniversary of the Our Lady of the Scapular, and in 2002, he celebrated the 500th anniversary of the Marian local shrine, for which occasion Pope John Paul II sent a special letter. One year later Jubilee Doors were unveiled and dedicated.

Since 1997, a complete restoration of the church has been carried out, both inside and outside: 
 in 2002 the chapel of the Holy Cross, with Art déco restored polychrome was opened for daily adoration and dedicated to the Sacrament of Penance;
 the statue of St. John the Apostle was restored;
 part of the decor of the altar in the gone Chapel of St. John was renovated as well.

On March 25, 2004, by decision of Pope John Paul II, the parish church became the Cathedral of the newly created diocese of Bydgoszcz: the Our Lady of Beautiful Love, whose image is set above the main altar, was established as its patroness. Bishop Jan Tyrawa was nominated at the head of the diocese; in 2017, he is till in position. 
From 2013 to 2015, roof flat tiles covering the chancel, the vestry, the main aisle and the church tower were substituted for Monk and Nun tiles. In addition, work was carried out on the roof over the chancel and the main aisle to recondition the 16th century pine-wood beam network which required immediate intervention.

Patrons 
The first patron of the church was Saint Nicholas of Mira.

During the following consecration, in 1466, four holy bishops were established as patrons: St. Nicholas, St. Martin of Tours, St. Adalbert of Prague and St. Stanislaus the Martyr of Szczepanów.

Full naming call is rarely used to designate the temple. Apart from specific patron's cult office, by and large the temple is called St. Nicholas-St. Martin church, as mentioned during an 1831 consecration, limiting the church's official name.

Architecture

Exteriors 

The temple follows Brick Gothic form, with a closed chancel facing east, three naves and a square tower on the south. On the west side is a double-decker porch with arcades, which gives onto the main entrance to the church with the Renaissance oak door (17th century) decorated with Bydgoszcz coat of arms and bearing the initials of city guilds and townsmen (1925).

The 24 by  square structure is adorned with pinnacles: the western one is filled with six painted areas, and topped with a crucifix and a triangular angel, from 1848. The triangular eastern peak divides six polygonal lesenes passing through the pinnacle. On the eastern roof tip stands an octagonal baroque turret roof lantern by Wojciech Łochowski.

Ceiling features different techniques:
 Basic vaulted roof in the chancel;
 Rib vault in the nave;
 Barrel vault with lunettes in the sacristy (17th-18th century);
 Groin vault in the western vestibule (16th-17th century);
 Dome with Neo-Gothic fan vaults in the porch under the tower (19th-20th century). 
These ornaments in the arch network is characteristic of the late Polish Gothic architecture. At the bottom of the south wall, are the so-called Bread stones, supposed to save the daily bread of the parishioners, according to the conviction of the then builders.

The window openings in the chancel and the aisles are closed with pointed arches. The octagonal pillars of interiors, set on pedestals and crowned with cornices, carry spear-glass arcades. Chancel walls are crowned with a Gothic frieze and a baroque profiled cornice.
The church's three-storey tower is divided into three parts by ring friezes. The highest floor was built during the renovation of the church in 1650. It can be assumed that the wooden tower was previously crowned by a tower. The porch under the south boasts a gothic portal from the second half of the 15th century.

Chapel 
The only surviving chapel of the original building stands by the northern wall. It is a small square building displaying oculus on the outside three walls, capped with a Renaissance dome topped by a roof lantern with a bell-shaped roof and a cross from 1617.

The thin pilasters of the roof lantern display mascarons, while each oculus is sheltered by grillwork. The dome outside is covered metal, while interior reveals art déco polychrome. Initially separated from the main building by a grille, the entrance to the chapel was changed in 2002 to glazing, allowing daily adoration to the Sacrament of Penance.

Interiors 
The interior of the temple displays a baroque decor from the 17th century. Main ornaments reside in the seven baroque altars, with altar frontals and old paintings and sculptures.

The most valuable item is the Gothic painting of the Madonna with the Rose (1467). Also noticeable are:
 a Renaissance crucifix (1525) in the chapel of the Holy Cross;
 a picture of St. Anthony of Padua (1550–1600, Florentine school);
 a picture of St. Barbara (1650–1700);
 a picture of St. Joseph with a young Christ (1690);
 the baroque image of Our Lady of the Scapular (1700);
 a picture of St. Roch (1841).

Altars

Relics 
In the 15th century, relics, displayed for public viewing, rested in six silver crosses gilded with pearls and precious stones. The 18th-century relic collection included the remains of nine saints: St. Andrew the Apostle, St Castulus, St Felicitas of Rome, St. Boniface and St. Urban – early Christian martyrs, St. Cecilia and St. Catherine of Alexandria – Virgins and Early Christian martyrs, St. Adalbert and St. Nicholas – bishops and patrons of the church. This collection was lost in the 19th century when reliquaries were destroyed with.

Today, the church reliquary keeps 17 bones of one of the 11000 virgins, companions of Saint Ursula, which were acquired
by Bernardine Church of Our Lady Queen of Peace. Relics are deposited in the tabernacle altar of St. Anthony.

Decor and religious items 
The church still possesses part of its original furniture, items that survived damage and looting. It also inherited religious articles from non-existing churches in Bydgoszcz, especially the Carmelite's and Bernardine's, after the secularization of monastic convents decided by the Prussian authorities in the 1830s.

Notable religious artefacts

In addition to this list, other items date back to pre-partition period:
 A dozen of vases and liturgical vestments from the 16th to 18th centuries (monstrance, pyx, chalice, two patens, two incense caskets, four candlesticks and four chasubles);
 Five tombstones (16th-17th century);
 One epitaph (17th century);
 A stone holy water font, located under the southern tower porch (15th century).

Tombstones and commemorative plaques 
In the church's porch and inside the building are several dozen commemorative plaques and tombstones, partly from the pre-partition period. Outside, other plaques have been placed on the walls of the church and memorial monuments have been established.

Organ 
First original church organ was used until 1763: at this date, the city funded a new instrument, with pedals, two keyboards and five bellows, which operated played until the 19th century.
The church organ was built by Paul Voelkner around 1907. The tracker action instrument has 28 pipes, 2 manual keyboards and one pedal keyboard. It is not certain whether the organ has been built for the cathedral: Lech Łikki states in his Bydgoszcz guide that parish authorities transferred the instrument from the demolished Jesuit church in 1940. It has been probably rebuilt during World War II by a firm of Gdańsk. Thorough refurbishments have been carried out in 1965 and in the 1980s.

Statue of John Nepomucene 
There is no precise early history of the figure. Its existence is first mentioned in 1745, when a visitation of Bromberg parish occurred. It is thought the execution of the statue can be dated back to the first years after the canonization of the priest, in 1729. In 1762, municipal authorities financed the Lamp to St. John Nepomucene, which allowed the sculpture to be illuminated in the same way as more famous representations at the time, in Prague or Kowary.
The relocation of the statue to the bank of the Brda river happened in the 1950s after a restoration work led by Father Franciszek Ksawer Hanelt, then parish priest. Ground leveling in 1954 necessitated the demolition of the original brick pillar, replaced by a granite pedestal; during these works, the star crowning the figure was removed.

Today the statue is located on a square, north of the cathedral, on a bridle of the Brda river, nearby the Parish weir.
The saint is dressed in priestly robes, featuring baroque style: a cassock and a surplice -similar to those reserved for prelate and canon, a Roman amice and a biretta on his head. He holds a crucifix with both hands, to remind his tied hands during his martyrdom (drowned in the Vltava river).

Worship of the Marian images in the church

Image of Our Lady of Beautiful Love 

The worship of the image dates back to the Renaissance period. In the 16th century, a rich collection of marian votive offerings had been gathered. According to descriptions between 1712 and 1745, on a tin background, pictures were star crowned and silver-and-gold dressed. As a mark of thankfulness, items were hung to them: votives, coral strings, jewels, earpieces, chains, medals, scapulars, pendants or ribbons. Two magnificent votives contributed to the city's renown. One of them, donated before 1745 and displaying Bydgoszcz coat of arms, contained a ritualized image of the Mother of God. The majority of the votives offered between the partition period and the end of the 18th century were dedicated to the support of the Kosciuszko Insurrection.

The 15th-century Virgin Mary with a rose had been placed in the northern aisle of the parish church, and its reputation grew from the middle of the 17th century, making the church play an attractive role among local Marian believers. It is possible that the painting was created under the influence of Rhine and Flemish painting in Poland.

From 1699 to 1712, the painting was associated with pontifical indulgences on the way to Purgatory, under the authority of the Holy See, renewed every ten years by the ordinary. From 1772 to 1920, Prussian occupation brought down the cult of the miraculous image. It regained momentum after the re-recreation of the independent Polish state in 1918, and was even more important after the end of World War II. During the war, Nazi authorities ordered this icon -like most valuable museum and church collections- to be transported out of Bydgoszcz. It stayed here, on the altar of a side chapel, till September 26, 1945. In 1950, the painting was restored in workshops in Toruń.

The Virgin Mary with a rose was twice crowned:
 first coronation occurred on May 29, 1966, at the Church of Our Lady of Perpetual Help in Bydgoszcz, by Stefan Wyszyński, Primate of Poland, who gave it its official name, Matki Bożej Pięknej Miłości;
 The second one took place on June 7, 1999, led by Pope John Paul II. During a mass followed by 600 000 believers at Bydgoszcz airfield, the Pope decorated the image with two new crowns for the Mother and the Son.

This second coronation influenced the image's popularity, urging the clergy to organize a permanent mission of confession in the cathedral to satisfy the constant presence of people praying before the picture.

On March 25, 2004, Pope John Paul II created the Roman Catholic Diocese of Bydgoszcz, with Our Lady of Beautiful Love and Michał Kozal as co-patrons.

Image of Our Lady of the Scapular in Bydgoszcz 

The history of the cult of the image is related to the presence of the Carmelites Monastery in Bydgoszcz since 1397, which pastoral activity was centered on the conduct of Marian services and the promotion of religious confraternity. An important element of the Carmelite service was the cult of the scapular as a protection against damnation. It has been introduced after a vision received by Saint Simon Stock in 1251, where Mary is said to have appeared and given him the Carmelite habit, the Brown Scapular, which several Popes confirmed as Carmelite privilege.
In 1470, in the Carmelites Church was created the Brotherhood of Our Lady of the Scapular, after having received approval by Father Bernard, head of the Czech-Polish Carmelite Province. The Brotherhood had a structure, closely mirroring the hierarchy of the Carmelite Order: elders carried the title of priors and sub-priors, the fraternity included seven consuls, whose task was to settle organizational matters, two arbitrators who solved disputes, and two makeshift settlers to settle legal problems. There were not titular dignitaries, each members being committed to specific actions.
Noble patrons were members of the Voivode or the Castellan of Brzesko-Kujawski, Bydgoszcz Starosta or were representatives of the country nobility. The selected noble supporters were approved by the monastery, while the clergymen were always a Carmelite preacher. Upon entering the fraternity, the brother received his scapular.

In the second half of the 17th century, the Brotherhood of the Scapular became a mass organization, with influence extending far beyond Bydgoszcz premises, reaching lands south of Wągrowiec and north of Warmia and Kwidzyn. The fraternity was prosperous, receiving numerous donations and owned four banks – two in Bydgoszcz, one in Gniezno and one in Fordon. 
The most important day for the Brotherhood was on July 16, during Our Lady of Mount Carmel feast, being the celebration of both the Carmelite Order and the Brotherhood. It was celebrated solemnly, with processions in all the city. On the other hand, Good Friday was the period when public scourging was performed in the Carmelites church of Bydgoszcz, together with some professional guilds (e.g. potters and helmsmen).

After the secularization decided by Prussian authorities in the 1810s, the Carmelite Monastery in Bydgoszcz was closed (1816) and Carmelite Church was razed (1822): the Brotherhood of the Scapular moved to St. Martin-St. Nicholas parish church, bringing also their altar. In 1888, thanks to the efforts of the parish priest, Józef Choraszewski, the Archdiocese of Gniezno granted the Brotherhood with the responsibility to maintain the altar and the paintings. In 1927, the fraternity was 284 members strong, and in the 1930s it dropped down to 100.

Our Lady of the Scapular in Bydgoszcz has been crowned twice:
 First coronation happened before partition period, but the exact date is not known. 
 Second coronation took place on the July 16, 2001, led by Archbishop Henryk Muszyński, while celebrating the Jubilee-750th anniversary of the Scapular of Our Lady of Mount Carmel.

Church related facilities

Parish school 

The exact date of creation of the parish school in Bydgoszcz is unknown, but its origins are related to the creation of the parish church in Bydgoszcz, and the privileges associated with it, around 1346. The building opened after the middle of the 14th century: first graduates traveled to Krakow to the Jagiellonian University around 1419
The parish school was an institution in the city landscape and in the awareness of its inhabitants, being then housed in a brick building containing several chambers, on the edge of the churchyard cemetery, on the plot of today's house at street in Przyrzecze street 2.
In 1532, about 150 boys were registered, making it an important school at the time. It was then managed by the parson of the church. 
The main task of the school was to educate the youth, who later would perform the duties of priests. However, in the 15th century, its role changed in favor of a more "secular" curriculum. The higher degree covered arithmetic, geometry, music and astronomy. Further studies were possible in collegiate, and later at university. In the 17th century, the school declined, victim of the competition of the newly opened Jesuit College and established academic institutions in Gdańsk, Elbląg, Torun or Chełmno.

By the beginning of the 18th century, the building was almost ruined, despite the efforts of the town council to take over the totality of school's costs. The construction in itself was used as a barn, and pupils transferred to a basic house erected on the eastern wall of the sacristy, furnished with benches and tiled stables. During Prussian times, the actual building was erected (1834–1854) to meet the needs of the parish school, on the site of the older derelict edifice.

In 1947 the building was transformed into a parish kindergarten. In 1982, the newly appointed Vicar of Bydgoszcz, Jan Viktor Nowak, inaugurated in the house the Primate Institute of Christian Culture – Cardinal Stefan Wyszyński. In 1989, the institute was granted the status of State higher education institution. Since 1998, it is an official section of Poznań Theological University. With the creation of the Diocese of Bydgoszcz in 2004, and the move, three years later, of the seat of the High Seminary of Bydgoszcz Diocese to the historic building at Grodzka Street 18, it was decided to move also the Primate Institute there. Since that time, the former parish school houses the library of the Primate Institute of Christian Culture.

The parish library 
Especially for the use of priests and parish school staff the parish library numbered in 144 manuscripts and printed books in 1712, 104 volumes in 1745, but only 97 in 1763. 
In the 17th century, during library's heyday, Jakub Ignacy Włodzimierski, parish priest of Bydgoszcz and Solecki, moved in 1686 manuscripts away to Solec Kujawski.

A small portion of the library's resources were used daily: mainly copies of the Bible and liturgical or musical books (about 27 volumes of Missals, agendas, breviaries, antiphonaries, graduals, psalms). Other book addressed predominantly works of theology, philosophy, ethics, canon law, clerical topics, including collections of sermons, hagiographies, comments on the Old and New Testament, and apologetic writings directed against Lutheranism and Calvinism.

In the 18th century, the parish library was one of the richest in the city in terms of books, behind the Bernardine Monastery Library, which owned approximately 1500 volumes. In 1829, at the dissolution of the monastery, most precious manuscripts of the library were transferred moved a few years later to the parish church where they survived until 1907, when they have been moved to the Provincial and Municipal Public Library.

Cemetery 
Church cemetery was founded in the 14th century, at the time of the erection of the parish and the construction of the church, and was used until the end of the 18th century. Before Polish partition, clergymen, patricians and Polish nobles were buried in decorated crypts located underneath church chancel, naves and chapels.

Prussian authorities closed this cemetery and established another one called Old parish cemetery further north, well separated from the church.

In 1906, Father Ryszard Markwart, parish parson, founded on the northern outskirts of Bromberg a New parish cemetery, to solve the problem of capacity of the old place.

Bells 
First documents related to the church bells date back to the middle of the 17th century. Bydgoszcz mayor Wojciech Łochowski reported in his Chronicles that they were placed in the bell tower at the beginning of the 16th century, and also, by 1660, in a small ridge turret, tin covered, standing by the edge of the roof temple.

During 18th-century parish visits, four bells were listed:
 Marcin, cast in 1652 at Augustyn Koesche's workshop in Toruń. On its body was carved a prayer to St. Martin, with the casting date (1652);
It was cast by Mikołaj Petersilge's workshop from Toruń in 1758, and re-cast in 1864, keeping the original inscriptions;
 Holy Spirit, founded in 1642 by Augustyn Koesche's workshop. It was re-melted in 1865, keeping the original engravings.

In 1801, six bells were listed: the four upper mentioned, and two smaller ones in the sacristy and in the ridge turret. In 1838, a fifth bell was hung on the southern church belfry: Józef, cast in 1720 in Hinrich Wredne's workshop, which had been operating till 1904. On its body, reliefs referred to Virgin Mary, Saint Joseph and Jesus.
In the turret on the top of the church were five small bells, some of them might have been hung by the Prussian authorities, seized from monastic and hospital churches in the vicinity. Others came from various origins, in 1559 and 1668.

In 1864 and 1865, bronze craftsman Fryderyk Schultz from Chełmno melted down several old bells and cast three new ones: Mikołaj , Maria , and Holy Spirit .

At the end of the 19th century, five bells were hung in the parish belfry: 1864-Mikołaj, the largest one, Józef (1720), Marcin (1652), Maria (1865) and Holy Spirit (1864). Eventually, at the beginning of the 20th century, thanks to the work of Ryszard Markwart, four large bells were still in the parish church, three of which had been founded in the last 50 years: 1864-Mikołaj and smaller ones, Marcin and Maria, cast in 1904. These bells were seized by Prussian authorities for war purposes and melted down at the end of World War I.

After the re-recreation of the Polish state in 1918, parish priest Tadeusz Skarbek-Malczewski started the process of getting new bells. Meanwhile, the Church of Our Lady of Loreto in Warsaw received back its bells seized by USSR, as a consequence of the Peace of Riga (1921).

In 1922, Tadeusz Skarbek-Malczewski noticed that three of the bells returned to Warsaw belonged in fact to the Cathedral of Kamianets-Podilskyi in Ukraine: consequently, he championed the idea to get these orphan bells to Bydgoszcz. Finally, in November 1923, those bells arrived to Bydgoszcz, one of them being handed over to Łabiszyn.

In 1929, four new additional bells were founded by bell caster Karol Szwabe from Biała: Wojciech, Marcin, Mikołaj and Annunciation of the Blessed Virgin Mary. These bells were confiscated during World War II, melted down by the Third Reich to support war effort.

In the end, only two bells survived the second World War and are still preserved today in the belfry of the parish church:
 A 1641-bell from Sts. Peter and Paul Cathedral of Kamianets-Podilskyi –  diameter, . Its reliefs indicate it was founded by Wojciech Wolskilnus and canon Stanisław Rilski. This bell was immortalized in Henryk Sienkiewicz's novel Fire in the Steppe, to call the alarm during the 1672 siege of Podolsky, and in an oath scene between hero Michał Wołodyjowski and his friend Kettling;
 A 1737-bell from the Dominican church of Kamianets-Podilskyi. Its Dominican origins are engraved on its body.

See also

 Bydgoszcz
 Roman Catholicism in Poland
 Mill Island in Bydgoszcz
 Grodzka Street in Bydgoszcz
 Jezuicka Street in Bydgoszcz
 Farna Street in Bydgoszcz

References

External links 
  Church parish site

Bibliography 
  
  
  
  
  
  
  
  
  
  
  
  
  
  
  
  
  
  

Cathedral
Cultural heritage monuments in Bydgoszcz
Roman Catholic cathedrals in Poland
The Most Holy Virgin Mary, Queen of Poland
Roman Catholic churches completed in 1425